Gustav Schäfer may refer to:

Gustav Schäfer (rower) (1906–1991), German Olympic rower
Gustav Schäfer (drummer) (born 1988), drummer of Tokio Hotel